Giusto Spigno (4 June 1916 – 29 April 1982) was an Italian sailor who competed in the 1952 Summer Olympics.

References

External links
 

1916 births
1982 deaths
Italian male sailors (sport)
Olympic sailors of Italy
Sailors at the 1952 Summer Olympics – 6 Metre